In addition to several other ships, two ships of the Imperial German Navy and one ship of the Austro-Hungarian Navy have been named SMS Nautilus, after the Greek word for a sailor.

 was a gunboat built for the Austro-Hungarian Navy launched in 1873 with her sister ship .
 was the first  built for the Imperial German Navy and launched in 1906.

German Navy ship names